Sharifuddin Shariq (born 13 March 1935) is an Indian politician and member of Jammu & Kashmir National Conference. He is member of 15th Lok Sabha from Baramulla.

Personal life
Sharifuddin Shariq was born on 13 March 1935 in Handwara, Kupwara district, Jammu and Kashmir to M. Abdul Gani and Sahiba Begum. He is married to Sarwar Begum.

References

Living people
1935 births
India MPs 2009–2014
People from Jammu and Kashmir
People from Kupwara district
Jammu and Kashmir MLAs 2002–2008
Jammu & Kashmir National Conference politicians
Lok Sabha members from Jammu and Kashmir
Rajya Sabha members from Jammu and Kashmir